Chaudhary Dalbir Singh (1926-1987) was an Indian politician and cabinet minister.

Early life
Chaudhary Dalbir Singh is born in a Chamar family to Kani Ram and Kalawati at Prabhuwala, Punjab, British India. His family was influenced from Arya Samaj movement.

He went for higher studies at D.A.V College, Lahore after suggestion from Ram Singh, his brother-in-law who was posted there as a Panchayat Officer. There he be-friended Ch.Chand Ram but later they have to move because of partition of India. But he completed his graduation from Govt. College, Rohtak. He also got a job of Block Development Officer but declined to join it.

His daughter, Kumari Selja is a prominent Dalit leader from INC. She is a former M.P from Ambala and Sirsa, Union Minister and Joint-Secretary of AIMC.

Politics
He was a member of the 4th, 5th and 7th Lok Sabha of India from Sirsa.
He also got elected from Tohana Constituency in 1952 elections but his election was set aside on the pretext of being under age. In the 1957 Punjab general election he was elected from Hansi constituency.
He was Deputy Minister for Irrigation (1957–62), Deputy Union Minister for Petroleum & Chemicals (1971–73), Heavy Industries (1973–74), Works & Housing (19744-75) and Shipping and Transport (1975–77). He was also Minister of state for Petroleum, Chemicals & Fertilizers (1980–82) and Energy - Petroleum (1982–83) and Dept. of Coal (1983-84).
He was president of Haryana Pradesh Congress Committee and General Secretary of AICC.

References

External links 

 Official biographical sketch in Parliament of India website

1926 births
1987 deaths
People from Hisar district
Indian National Congress politicians
India MPs 1967–1970
India MPs 1971–1977
India MPs 1984–1989
People from Sirsa district
People from Hisar (city)
Lok Sabha members from Haryana
People from Sirsa, Haryana
India MPs 1980–1984